The 2015 Zamfara State House of Assembly election was held on April 11, 2015, to elect members of the Zamfara State House of Assembly in Nigeria. All the 24 seats were up for election in the Zamfara State House of Assembly.

Results

Shinkafi 
APC candidate Bello Maiwurno won the election.

Talata Mafara North 
APC candidate Isah Abdulmumin won the election.

Talata Mafara South 
APC candidate Aliyu Ango-Kagara won the election.

Bukkuyum South 
APC candidate Abubakar Ajiya won the election.

Bukkuyum North 
APC candidate Malam-Mani Malam-Mummuni won the election.

Gummi I 
APC candidate Muhammad Abubukar won the election.

Gummi II 
APC candidate Hashimu Shehu-Gazura won the election.

Maradun I 
APC candidate Shehu Ibrahim won the election.

Maradun II 
APC candidate Muazu Faru won the election.

Bakura 
PDP candidate Tukur Jekada won the election.

Anka 
APC candidate Bello Fagon won the election.

Maru South 
APC candidate Abdullahi Dansadau won the election.

Maru North 
APC candidate Abu Ibrahim-Maru won the election.

Bungudu West 
APC candidate Mansur Muhammad Dambala won the election.

Bungudu East 
APC candidate Ibrahim Kwatarkwash won the election.

Gusau I 
APC candidate Sanusi Rikiji won the election.

Gusau II 
APC candidate Dayyabu Rijiya won the election.

Tsafe West 
APC candidate Aminu Danjibga won the election.

Tsafe East 
APC candidate Salisu Musa won the election.

Zurmi West 
APC candidate Maniru Gidanjaja won the election.

Zurmi East 
APC candidate Yusuf Moriki won the election.

Birnin Magaji 
APC candidate Kabiru Moyi won the election.

Kaura Namoda South 
APC candidate Lawali Dagonkade won the election.

Kaura Namoda North 
APC candidate Abubakar Dahiru won the election.

References 

Zamfara State elections
2015 Nigerian House of Assembly elections